XHOI-FM is a radio station on 92.3 FM in León, Guanajuato. The station is owned by Promomedios and is known as BluFM with a rock-pop format.

History
XHOI received its first concession on March 7, 1970. It was owned by Guadalupe Flores Flores until 1981, when it was transferred to the current concessionaire. It was originally known as "Stereo OI".

References

Radio stations in Guanajuato
Radio stations established in 1970
Mexican radio stations with expired concessions